Richard Trenkel was an East German racing driver, who twice won his class of the DDR Sportscar Championship, in 1953 and 1953, who died 5 July 1964.

Racing driver

Trenkel was a competent racing driver who raced mainly between 1948 and 1963, who only even raced with East and West Germany. During these years, recording a number of good results, including 12 class wins and numerous podiums finishes, with the majority of these at national events. His greatest racing achievement, when partnered by Walter Schlüter, he finished fourth in the Internationales ADAC-1000 km Rennen Weltmeisterschaftslauf Nürburgring.

Sadly, Trenkel is best remembered for incident during the 1954 Sachsenring-Rennen Hohenstein-Ernstthal. During the race, Trenkel lost control of his Porsche, hit and killed three race officials. His last International event was 1963 Rallye Wiesbaden where he finished 11th overall.

Racing record

Career highlights

References

World Sportscar Championship drivers
1964 deaths
German racing drivers
East German sportsmen